The Synagogue of Neuilly-sur-Seine, located at 12 rue Ancelle, built in 1878, is the oldest synagogue in the Paris suburbs of France.

Top of the Jewish presence in Neuilly
The first significant evidence of a Jewish presence in Neuilly is the "house of refuge for Jewish children", a home created in 1866 by Coralie Cahen the house also hosted prostitutes and their children. Initially located at Romainville then Neuilly Boulevard Eugene (now Boulevard Victor Hugo), it moved in 1883 to 19, Boulevard de la Saussaye where it stayed until the 1980s. Better known by the abbreviated name of "Refuge," it housed many young Jews isolated, without family, after the Second World War and after the independence of Algeria, and the subsequent massmigration of Jews to France.

The Synagogue

By 1869, there was a community located in an apartment at 15 rue Louis-Philippe. Chairman, Godchaux Oulry, a native of Lorraine, succeeded in raising the funds necessary to build a synagogue. The architect was Emile Uhlmann, who chose to build in the Neo-Byzantine style. The opening took place in 1878.

The first rabbi of Neuilly in 1888, was Simon Debré, father of Professor Robert Debré and the grandfather of the General de Gaulle's Prime-Minister Michel Debré.

The community grew until World War II and the synagogue expanded in 1937 under the eye of architects Germain Debré and Hirsch.

As it was for all Jewish communities, the war brought desolation. Rabbi Robert Meyers and his wife Suzanne (née Bauer) were deported to Auschwitz in 1943. A plaque outside the synagogue commemorates the deportation of all Jews inhabitants of Neuilly and others, and the courageous action of the Righteous Among the Nations in Neuilly. On Rue Edouard Nortier, another plaque commemorates the names of 17 children aged 3 to 11 years, who were housed in a former clinic run by the Nuns, they were on July 25, 1944, rounded up, deported and murdered by the Nazis.

The rebirth after the war was difficult. It is important to note the efforts of Rabbi David Feuerwerker (he was the rabbi from 1946 to 1948) to create a study circle and a circle of young people. His successor, Edouard Gourevitch, saw the arrival in 1962 of huge number of Jews from Algeria who brought a new vitality to the community.

In 1975, the Grand Rabbi Jerome Cahen and his wife revived the community, turning resolutely towards youth. The number of believers increased dramatically.

In 1978, the centenary of the synagogue was celebrated in the presence of the authorities and former Prime Minister Michel Debré.

Rabbi Alexis Blum succeeds Jerome Cahen, who died in 1988.

In 2009, Rabbi Michael Azoulay, a member of the National Consultative Ethics Committee since 2008, succeeded Rabbi Alexis Blum.

Rabbis
 1888-1939: Simon Debré
 1928-1943: Robert Meyers (died Auschwitz)
 1945-1946: Henry Soil
 1946-1948: David Feuerwerker
 1948-1949: René Kapel
 1949-1975: Edouard Gourevitch 
 1975-1986: Jerome Cahen
 1988-2009: Alexis Blum
 2009 -: Michael Azoulay

Bibliography 
Editor Sylvie Zenouda, "The Synagogue de Neuilly-sur-Seine, 120-year history of a community", March 2000,

References

External links 

 Synagogue de Neuilly
 Community Center Jerome Cahen
 Article Neuilly sur Seine in the Jewish Encyclopedia

Algerian-Jewish culture in France
Neuilly
Synagogues completed in 1878
Buildings and structures in Hauts-de-Seine
Byzantine Revival architecture in France
Byzantine Revival synagogues